Santiago Vicente Feliú Sierra (March 29, 1962 – February 12, 2014) was a Cuban singer and songwriter. Born in Havana, he became part of the musical  movement known as nueva trova, which was the Cuban manifestation of the nueva canción movement and included such singers as Frank Delgado and Carlos Varela. Feliú wrote the songs "For Barbara" and "Without Julieta" and recorded 11 albums. His last album, Oh Life, came out in 2010.

On 12 February 2014, he felt severe pain in his chest and died of a heart attack before he could reach the hospital in Havana. He was 51 years old.

See also
List of musicians who play left-handed

References

External links

Santiago Feliu: Melody, naturalness, poetry.  OnCuba magazine, January 29, 2014.

1962 births
2014 deaths
Musicians from Havana
Cuban people of Catalan descent
20th-century Cuban male singers
Cuban songwriters
Male songwriters
21st-century Cuban male singers